Arroyo Seco is an  watercourse in Alameda County, California, that traverses through the city of Livermore, emptying into Arroyo Las Positas. Arroyo Seco means "dry stream" in Spanish. Arroyo Seco lies above the Arroyo Seco watershed, which includes the eastern part of the city of Livermore and also the Sandia National Laboratory. The Mocho Subbasin is the largest of the subbasins in the Livermore Valley watershed. This subbasin is bounded to the west by the Livermore Fault Zone and to the east by the Tesla Fault. A number of threatened and endangered species reside in this watershed.

See also
Mocho Subbasin

References

Rivers of Alameda County, California
El Camino Viejo
Washes of California
Tributaries of Alameda Creek